Cooks Creek is a  long 3rd order tributary of Fisher River in Surry County, North Carolina.

Course
Cooks Creek rises in a pond about 0.5 miles northwest of Red Brush, North Carolina.  Cooks Creek then flows south to join Fisher River about 1 mile north of New Hope, North Carolina.

Watershed
Cooks Creek drains  of area, receives about 47.8 in/year of precipitation, has a wetness index of 349.66, and is about 39% forested.

See also
List of rivers of North Carolina

References

Rivers of North Carolina
Rivers of Surry County, North Carolina